Downtown Elkin Historic District is a national historic district located at Elkin, Surry County, North Carolina. The district encompasses 51 contributing buildings and 2 contributing structures in the central business district of Elkin.  They were primarily built between about 1890 and 1950 and include notable examples of Early Commercial and Bungalow / American Craftsman architecture. Notable buildings and structures include the Gwyn-Foard House (c. 1855), Hugh G. Chatham Bridge (1931), Liberty Tobacco Warehouse (c. 1920), Harris Building (1902), U.S. Post Office (1937) designed by the Office of the Supervising Architect under Louis A. Simon, former Elkins Town Hall (1938–1939) built by the Works Progress Administration, Dobbin's Store (c. 1940), and the Riverside Hotel (1915–1925).

It was added to the National Register of Historic Places in 2000.

References

Historic districts on the National Register of Historic Places in North Carolina
Buildings and structures in Surry County, North Carolina
National Register of Historic Places in Surry County, North Carolina
Tobacco buildings in the United States